Nita Negrita (International title: Nita) is a 2011 Philippine television drama series broadcast by GMA Network. Directed by Gil Tejada Jr., it stars Barbie Forteza in the title role. It premiered on February 14, 2011 on the network's Dramarama sa Hapon line up replacing Little Star. The series concluded on June 10, 2011, with a total of 83 episodes. It was replaced by Sinner or Saint in its timeslot.

Cast and characters

Lead cast
 Barbie Forteza as Antoinette / Nita "Netnet" Raymundo

Supporting cast
 Joshua Dionisio as Prince Ramirez
 Lexi Fernandez as Mystica "Misty" Del Castillo
 Nova Villa as Ima
 Lotlot de Leon as Mirasol "Mira" Buenaventura
 Zoren Legaspi as Arturo Del Castillo
 Diana Zubiri as Danica
 Rachelle Ann Go as Amanda Del Castillo
 Bubbles Paraiso as Alexandra "Alex" Del Castillo
 Lollie Mara as Andrea Del Castillo
 Jenny Miller as Pia Antonio
 Dexter Doria as Segunda
 Jim Pebangco as Ben
 Alvin Aguilar as Edgar
 Miguel Tanfelix as Jun Jun
 Michelle Vito as Peachy
 Jhoana Marie Tan as Selyang
 Glenda Garcia as Belen
 Mel Kimura as Bella
 Sabrina San Diego

Guest cast
 Melijah Panturilla as young Misty

Blackface controversy
The show's use of blackface was widely criticized in the media and by academics. Axel Honneth professor of philosophy at both the University of Frankfurt and Columbia University stated that the show "presents the stereotypical theme of poverty being ascribed with skin colour", while Dr Elaine Marie Carbonell Laforteza, Lecturer in Cultural Studies Macquarie University, Australia, stated in her book The Somatechnics of Whiteness and Race: Colonialism and Mestiza Privilege, that "Nita does not appear 'authentically black', but painted as black. The effect is a caricature of blackness" and that "blackness is used to create Nita as a manifestation of black identity that is constantly open to scrutiny and mockery".

Ratings
According to AGB Nielsen Philippines' Mega Manila People/Individual television ratings, the pilot episode of Nita Negrita earned a 7.8% rating. While the final episode scored a 19.1% rating in Mega Manila household television ratings.

References

External links
 

2010s controversies
2011 Philippine television series debuts
2011 Philippine television series endings
African-American-related controversies
Blackface minstrelsy
Filipino-language television shows
GMA Network drama series
Obscenity controversies in television
Race-related controversies in television
Television controversies in the Philippines
Television shows set in the Philippines